The Christian-evangelical DMG interpersonal (DMG, former: "German Missionary Fellowship") based at Buchenauerhof in Sinsheim,  claims to be one of the largest Protestant missions in Germany. The legal status is a non-profit registered association.  Director and chairman of the Board is Günther Beck.

Aims 
The DMG offers young people,  Christian professionals and theologians, the opportunity to serve cross-culturally as a missionary as part of a network of 105 international partner organizations  and churches in 80 countries around the world. 
DMG offers a short-term mission program (6–24 months) for mostly young people aged 18 or older, a medium-term commitment (two to four years), long-term assignments (more than two years) as well as a “50-plus program“, which allows older Christians to use their experience and professional knowledge to help people in other countries  In 2018 they had 45 short-terms

The workers seek to live the gospel in word and deed, alleviating suffering, helping people holistically contributing to the circulation of the Bible and to building of Christian communities on four continents. This is done in close partnership and cooperation with the people, churches and Christian organizations on the ground.

History 
Founded in 1951 in Beatenberg (Switzerland) as the „German Missionary Fellowship, Association for Charity e. V.“ (DMG), the organization had its first office in a small attic in Stuttgart-Korntal. The first overseas worker Helmut Gaertner was sent to Spain in 1953, where he produced Christian radio broadcasts. Gaertner was later involved in the founding of the ERF-Medien in Germany. By the 1960s, the DMG had around 100 people working worldwide. In 1971 the Christian charity moved to the Buchenauerhof, Sinsheim. Today, around 400 people are employed in various projects around the world. Over the years, DMG built up a network of partnerships with more than 100 churches and nonprofit organizations around the world. DMG supports churches in central Europa in sending Christians to work in the partners projects. In January 2014, DMG was renamed: DMG interpersonal. The new logo was combined with the slogan “so people meet God“.

Work areas 
About 405 DMG-workers around the globe are active in the following areas: 'Building Christian communities, pioneering new projects, theological teaching ministry, children's, youth and student mission, relief, famine relief, linguistics, Bible translations, literature production, evangelism, Radio Mission, medical service, agricultural development assistance, flying services, AIDS and hygiene consultancy, assistance for street children, training of teachers, nurses, educators etc.

Global cooperation 
In collaboration with 105 local churches and international partner organizations and aid agencies the staff of the German Mission Community works in the following countries and continents:

 Europe: Belgium, France, Netherlands, Spain, Portugal, Italy, Switzerland, Austria, Germany, Czech Republic, Croatia, Romania, Bulgaria, Greece,  Armenia, Georgia, Russia and Ukraine.
 Asia: CIS, Central Asia, Mongolia, East Asia, Taiwan, Indonesia, Philippines, Thailand, Southeast Asia, Japan, Pakistan and the Orient.
 Africa: North Africa, Senegal, Chad, Niger, Burkina Faso, Ivory Coast,  Benin, Ethiopia, South Sudan, DR. Congo, Uganda, Kenya, Tanzania, Malawi, Zimbabwe, Mozambique, Madagascar,  Angola, Namibia and South Africa.
 America: Canada, USA, Mexico, Haiti, Costa Rica,  Colombia, Ecuador, Peru, Brazil, Argentina, Paraguay and Chile.
In addition there are currently around 50 short-term workers with DMG working around the world.
The DMG's workers come from Protestant Landeskirchen, Free churches and from various Christian churches from around 20 countries, mostly from Germany, Austria and Switzerland. These Christian churches send their cross-cultural workers as employees of DMG interpersonal.

Membership 
The DMG is member of “netzwerk-m“ (former: “Ring Missionarischer Jugendbewegungen, RMJ)“  (ring of missionary youth movements) and “Arbeitsgemeinschaft Evangelikaler Missionen (AEM)” (association of evangelical missions). It's committed to the guiding principles of the Evangelische Allianz. This binds them theologically and at the principles on the use of donations.

Honors 
 Dietrich Schmoll, who was working for the medical service of the DMG for many years, was awarded with the Order of Merit of the Federal Republic of Germany.
 Ursula Schmitz, who died in 2009, was a DMG missionary doctor in the Christian hospital “Tank” in northeast Pakistan and worked there for 20 years. 2010 she received posthumously the highest Order of Merit of the Republic of Pakistan.
 Andreas Hahn, a theologian formerly active in Wroclaw, received the Johann-Tobias-Beck-Preis 2010 (award) of the “Arbeitskreis für evangelikale Theologie” (working group awarded for evangelical theology). The prize of 1000 euros was awarded in December 2010.
 Rose Schwarz, who was working for a medical help project in Kenya was awarded the Order of Merit of the Federal Republic of Germany in 2014.
 Detlef Blöcher, former director until 2018

 Publications of the DMG  
 Magazine "DMG-informiert" (DMG-informs), run: 44,000, spread mainly in Central Europe, also known as e-paper
 Books and audio books for children and adults

 References 

 External links 
 Official Website (German)
 Official Website (English'')

Christian missionary societies
Evangelical organizations established in the 20th century
Christianity in Baden-Württemberg
1951 establishments in Switzerland